Norman Young may refer to:

 Norm Young, Seventh-day Adventist Christian theologian and New Testament scholar.
 Norman G. Young, American civil engineer
 Norman Young (baseball), American baseball player